Natalia Warner is a British actress.

Career
Warner made her film debut in Richard Ayoade's dystopian thriller The Double, which received a positive review from Empire. She stars as the female lead in Shoreline Entertainment's romantic drama Learning to Breathe (Official Selection at the 2016 London Raindance Film Festival), and British comedy The Five Wives and Lives of Melvyn Pfferberg, an Official Selection at the 2016 LA Shorts Fest. Warner made her American film debut in Temple, a psychological thriller set in Japan, from David Lynch's production company Absurda.

Warner starred in an international commercial for Boursin from Young & Rubicam.

Filmography

References

External links

Living people
British film actresses
21st-century British actresses
Year of birth missing (living people)